The Following is a List of Flags used in Cocos (Keeling) Islands in Australia

State Flag

Historical Flags

See also

List of Australian flags

References 

Australia
 
Flags of the Cocos (Keeling) Islands